David Witteveen is a former football (soccer) player who represented New Zealand at international level.

Witteveen made his full New Zealand debut in a 4–2 win over Fiji on 17 September 1986 and ended his international playing career with five A-international caps to his credit, his final cap an appearance in a 1–4 loss to Australia on 12 March 1989.

References

External links
 

Year of birth missing (living people)
Living people
New Zealand association footballers
New Zealand international footballers
Association footballers from Auckland
Association football midfielders